Fascin-3 also known as testis fascin is a protein that in humans is encoded by the FSCN3 gene.

See also 
 Fascin

References

Further reading